Issa Fomba (born 24 May 2001) is a Malian footballer who plays as a winger for Spanish club Málaga CF.

Career
Born in Bamako, Fomba joined Málaga CF's youth setup in the 2019 summer, from hometown side Derby Académie. In August 2020, after scoring 25 goals for the Juvenil A squad, he was included in the pre-season with the main squad.

On 13 September 2020, before even having appeared with the reserves, Fomba made his professional debut by coming on as a second-half substitute for Yanis Rahmani in a 2–0 loss at CD Tenerife in the Segunda División championship.

References

External links

2001 births
Living people
Sportspeople from Bamako
Malian footballers
Association football midfielders
Segunda División players
Málaga CF players
Malian expatriate footballers
Malian expatriate sportspeople in Spain
Expatriate footballers in Spain
21st-century Malian people